Brigadier General Juan Bautista Molina was an Argentine military commander and a pro-Nazi Argentine ultranationalist who led the Nationalist Liberation Alliance (ALN).

Molina was involved in a number of plots to overthrow the Argentine liberal government of Agustín Pedro Justo in the 1930s. In order to contain Molina, President Justo appointed Molina as Argentina's military attaché in Germany in 1933 where Molina witnessed the Nazi regime that impressed him. Molina was promoted to brigadier general in 1937 and this was followed by his appointment as director general of the army engineers in 1938. Molina retired from army service in 1938 and devoted attention to his leadership of the AJN.

In 1935, Molina called for the dissolution of the three powers of the national government, the abolition of political parties, the establishment of a military dictatorship, the enacting of press censorship, and actions to prevent "immorality", and changing the economic system to be led by guilds and the creation of a "consultative board [to] unite" workers and employers. In 1943, Molina led street demonstrations led by nationalist protestors against the Ramón Castillo government for its promotion of Argentine neutrality in World War II while Molina and his supporters were pro-Axis. During the protest, Molina's supporters shouted violent anti-American, anti-British, and anti-Semitic slogans, saying "Death to the British pigs" and "Death to the Jews".

References 

Year of birth missing
Year of death missing
Argentine fascists
Argentine generals
Nationalist Liberation Alliance politicians
Nazis from outside Germany